The Hoogovens Wijk aan Zee Steel Chess Tournament 1999 was the 61st edition of the Hoogovens Wijk aan Zee Chess Tournament. It was held in Wijk aan Zee in January 1999 and was won by world number one Garry Kasparov.

Kasparov, entering for the first time, finished half a point ahead of 1998 champion Viswanathan Anand, and whose final tally of 10 points included a seven-game winning streak, described the event as "by far the best tournament in my life" and stated that his  preparation was the strongest it had ever been due to computers.  The game Kasparov played against Veselin Topalov is one of Kasparov's most famous games, and is called "Kasparov's Immortal"; it is considered a masterpiece and some even consider it the best Chess game ever played.

{|class="wikitable" style="text-align:center;"
|+61st Hoogovens tournament, group A, 15–31 January 1999, Wijk aan Zee, Netherlands, Category XVIII (2678)
|-
! !! Player !! Rating
! 1 !! 2 !! 3 !! 4 !! 5 !! 6 !! 7 !! 8 !! 9 !!10 !!11 !!12 !!13 !!14 !! Total !! TPR !! Place
|-
|-style="background:#ccffcc;"
| 1 ||align="left"| || 2812
| || ½ || ½ || 0 || 1 || 1 || ½ || ½ || 1 || 1 || 1 || 1 || 1 || 1 || 10 || 2878 || 1
|-
| 2 ||align="left"| || 2781
| ½ || || ½ || ½ || 1 || ½ || 1 || ½ || ½ || 1 || 1 || 1 || ½ || 1 || 9½ || 2844 || 2
|-
| 3 ||align="left"| || 2751
| ½ || ½ || || ½ || ½ || 1 || 1 || ½ || ½ || ½ || ½ || ½ || 1 || ½ || 8 || 2758 || 3
|-
| 4 ||align="left"| || 2624
| 1 || ½ || ½ || || ½ || 0 || ½ || 0 || ½ || ½ || ½ || 1 || 1 || ½ || 7 || 2710 || 4–7
|-
| 5 ||align="left"| || 2619
| 0 || 0 || ½ || ½ || || ½ || 1 || 1 || ½ || 1 || ½ || ½ || ½ || ½ || 7 || 2711 || 4–7
|-
| 6 ||align="left"| || 2726
| 0 || ½ || 0 || 1 || ½ || || ½ || ½ || ½ || ½ || ½ || ½ || 1 || 1 || 7 || 2702 || 4–7
|-
| 7 ||align="left"| || 2670
| ½ || 0 || 0 || ½ || 0 || ½ || || 1 || ½ || 0 || 1 || 1 || 1 || 1 || 7 || 2707 || 4–7
|-
| 8 ||align="left"| || 2714
| ½ || ½ || ½ || 1 || 0 || ½ || 0 || || ½ || ½ || ½ || ½ || ½ || 1 || 6½ || 2674 || 8–9
|-
| 9 ||align="left"| || 2713
| 0 || ½ || ½ || ½ || ½ || ½ || ½ || ½ || || ½ || 1 || ½ || ½ || ½ || 6½ || 2674 || 8–9
|-
| 10 ||align="left"| || 2700
| 0 || 0 || ½ || ½ || 0 || ½ || 1 || ½ || ½ || || ½ || 1 || 0 || 1 || 6 || 2646 || 10
|-
| 11 ||align="left"| || 2606
| 0 || 0 || ½ || ½ || ½ || ½ || 0 || ½ || 0 || ½ || || 1 || ½ || ½ || 5 || 2596 || 11
|-
| 12 ||align="left"| || 2632
| 0 || 0 || ½ || 0 || ½ || ½ || 0 || ½ || ½ || 0 || 0 || || 1 || 1 || 4½ || 2571 || 12
|-
| 13 ||align="left"| || 2597
| 0 || ½ || 0 || 0 || ½ || 0 || 0 || ½ || ½ || 1 || ½ || 0 || || ½ || 4 || 2542 || 13
|-
| 14 ||align="left"| || 2541
| 0 || 0 || ½ || ½ || ½ || 0 || 0 || 0 || ½ || 0 || ½ || 0 || ½ || || 3 || 2477 || 14
|}

{| class="wikitable" style="text-align: center;"
|+ 61st Hoogovens tournament, group B, 19–31 January 1999, Wijk aan Zee, Netherlands, Category XI (2520)
! !! Player !! Rating !! 1 !! 2 !! 3 !! 4 !! 5 !! 6 !! 7 !! 8 !! 9 !! 10 !! 11 !! 12 !! Total !! TPR !! Place
|-
| 1 || align=left| || 2614 ||  || ½ || ½ || ½ || ½ || 1 || 1 || ½ || 1 || 1 || 1 || 1 || 8½ || 2722 || 1
|-
| 2 || align="left" | || 2545 || ½ ||  || ½ || ½ || ½ || 1 || 1 || ½ || ½ || ½ || 1 || 1 || 7½ || 2650 || 2
|-
| 3 || align="left" | || 2551 || ½ || ½ ||  || ½ || 1 || ½ || 1 || ½ || ½ || 1 || ½ || ½ || 7 || 2618 || 3–4
|-
| 4 || align="left" | || 2529 || ½ || ½ || ½ ||  || 0 || 1 || 1 || 1 || ½ || ½ || ½ || 1 || 7 || 2620 || 3–4
|-
| 5 || align="left" | || 2566 || ½ || ½ || 0 || 1 ||  || ½ || 0 || ½ || ½ || 1 || 1 || 1 || 6½ || 2580 || 5–6
|-
| 6 || align="left" | || 2534 || 0 || 0 || ½ || 0 || ½ ||  || 1 || 1 || 1 || 1 || 1 || ½ || 6½ || 2583 || 5–6
|-
| 7 || align="left" | || 2378 || 0 || 0 || 0 || 0 || 1 || 0 ||  || 1 || 1 || ½ || 1 || ½ || 5 || 2496 || 7
|-
| 8 || align="left" | || 2530 || ½ || ½ || ½ || 0 || ½ || 0 || 0 ||  || ½ || ½ || ½ || 1 || 4½ || 2453 || 8
|-
| 9 || align="left" | || 2528 || 0 || ½ || ½ || ½ || ½ || 0 || 0 || ½ ||  || 0 || ½ || 1 || 4 || 2417 || 9–10
|-
| 10 || align="left" | || 2445 || 0 || ½ || 0 || ½ || 0 || 0 || ½ || ½ || 1 ||  || ½ || ½ || 4 || 2424 || 9–10
|-
| 11 || align="left" | || 2470 || 0 || 0 || ½ || ½ || 0 || 0 || 0 || ½ || ½ || ½ ||  || ½ || 3 || 2349 || 11
|- 
| 12 || align="left" | || 2547 ||  0|| 0 || ½ || 0 || 0 || ½ || ½ || 0 || 0 || ½ || ½ ||  || 2½ || 2306 || 12

|}

References

Tata Steel Chess Tournament
1999 in chess
1999 in Dutch sport